Lakyawn may refer to either of two Burmese villages:
Lakyawn, Chipw
Lakyawn, Hsawlaw